Curetis felderi, the white-beaked sunbeam, is a species of butterfly belonging to the lycaenid family. It is found in Southeast Asia (Sumatra, Peninsular Malaya, Borneo).

References

External links
"Curetis Hübner, [1819]" at Markku Savela's Lepidoptera and Some Other Life Forms. Retrieved June 3, 2017.

felderi
Butterflies described in 1884